Norbert Patrick Hayes (November 21, 1896 – July 13, 1945) was an American football end and fullback for the Racine Legion and the Green Bay Packers of the National Football League (NFL). He played at the collegiate level at Marquette University.

Biography
Hayes was born on November 21, 1896, in Kaukauna, Wisconsin. He played high school football for Green Bay West High School. He died in 1945.

See also
Green Bay Packers players

References

External links

1896 births
1945 deaths
People from Kaukauna, Wisconsin
Green Bay Packers players
Racine Legion players
Marquette Golden Avalanche football players
Players of American football from Wisconsin
Burials in Wisconsin